Michilimackinac is derived from an Ottawa Ojibwe name for present-day Mackinac Island and the region around the Straits of Mackinac between Lake Huron and Lake Michigan. Early settlers of North America applied the term to the entire region along Lakes Huron, Michigan, and Superior. Today it is considered to be mostly within the boundaries of Michigan, in the United States. Michilimackinac was the original name for present day Mackinac Island and Mackinac County.

History

Woodland Period (1000 BCE–1650 CE) 
Pottery first appears during this period in the style of the Laurel complex. The people of the area engaged in long-distance trade, likely as part of the Hopewell tradition.

The Anishinaabe and the French (1612–1763) 
The Straits of Mackinac linking Lakes Michigan and Huron was a strategic area controlling movement between the two lakes and much of the pays d'en haut. It was controlled by Algonquian Anishinaabe nations including the Ojibwa (called Chippewa in the United States) and the Odawa. The area was known to the Odawa as Michilimackinac, meaning "Big Turtle". For these people, "Michilimackinac is literally the birthplace and centre of the world" and is where the Three Fires Confederacy took place.

The Anishinaabe had good relations with the Iroquoian-speaking Wyandot, who were the first group to establish relations with the French  after Champlain's arrival in 1608. The Anishinaabe used these relations to trade indirectly with the French.After the fall of Huronia in the Beaver Wars, The Anishinaabe began to trade directly with the French, and started inviting French settlers to Michilimackinac.

The French were the first Europeans to explore the area, beginning in 1612. They established trading posts and Jesuit Catholic missions. One of the oldest missions, St. Ignace Mission, was located on the north side of the strait at Point Iroquois, near present-day St. Ignace, Michigan. This mission was established in 1671 by the Jesuit Father Jacques Marquette. In 1654, a large Iroquois force was attacked by the Odawa and Ojibwe as they tried to cross the straits near Michilimackinac. In 1658, the Iroquois attacked again, but were again defeated by the Anishinaabe.

In 1683, under pressure from the Odawa, the French established a presence on the North side of the straits at the St. Ignace Mission in an alliance with the Anishinaabe against the Iroquois.Between 1670 and 1700, Michilimackinac flourished and became one of the central sites of the fur trade. Soon, French visitors reported vast summer markets taking place along the shorelines each year. Both natives and newcomers flocked to take advantage. Hundreds of Native Americans from around Lakes Michigan and Superior would make the voyage to the straits to meet French traders coming up from the St. Lawrence. In the words of a later French traveler, Michilimackinac became "the landing place and refuge of all the savages who trade their peltries." Consequently, Michilimackinac rapidly became the "general meeting-place for all the French who go to trade with stranger tribes."In 1715, the French established a fort and settlement on the south side of the strait.  It was called Fort Michilimackinac. The fort became a major trading post, attracting Native Americans from throughout the northern Great Lakes. After Great Britain defeated France in the Seven Years' War (French and Indian War), their colonial forces took over the fort and territory.

Fort Michilimackinac fell to an Ojibwa attack during the Native American uprising of 1763, sometimes called Pontiac's War. It was reoccupied by the British in September 1764. In 1780, during the American Revolution, British commandant Patrick Sinclair moved the British trading and military post to Mackinac Island, which was held by the British for some time, and abandoned Fort Michilimackinac after the move. After the rebel Americans gained independence in the Revolutionary War, this site became part of a territory of the United States. The fort saw its only military action 17 July 1812 when Lieutenant Porter Hanks bloodlessly surrendered it to the British during the war of 1812.

Today, Fort Michilimackinac is preserved as a tourist site. Re-enactors portray the historic activities of the French and English. An archeological dig at the site is open for viewing.

European presence in the Michilimackinac area

Notes

References

Further reading

External links
1839 tourist map of Michigan showing extent of Michilimackinac area

Pre-statehood history of Michigan
French North America